The BICh-7  was a tailless sport/touring aircraft designed and built in the USSR from  1929.

Development 
Chyeranovskii designed an enlarged BICh-3, at approximately 1.5 scale, with tandem open cockpits, underslung elevons (à la Junkers) centreline mono-wheel, wing-tip rudders with skids with no tail. Flight testing commenced in 1929 but was soon halted due to the very poor handling characteristics which rendered the BICh-7 almost impossible to take off.
The BICh-7 was completely rebuilt as the BICh-7A, modifications included: enclosed tandem cockpits, a conventional style tail-skid undercarriage, and a fin with rudder faired into the rear of the cockpit nacelle.
Flight tests resumed,  in 1932, with much improved handling other than excessive speed loss when turning and engine vibration. The speed loss was attributed to interference between the large elevons and the rudder and was alleviated by adding breaker strips to the elevons and setting them at a lower incidence.

Variants 
 BICh-7 – initial unsuccessful version with open cockpits wing-tip rudders and skids and centre-line mono-wheel.
 BICh-7A – Modified version with enclosed cockpits, fin and rudder and conventional style tail-skid undercarriage

Specifications (BICh-7A)

See also

References

 Gunston, Bill. "The Osprey Encyclopaedia of Russian Aircraft 1875 – 1995". London, Osprey. 1995.

External links

 http://www.ctrl-c.liu.se/misc/RAM/bich-7.html

1920s Soviet and Russian sport aircraft
Chyeranovskii aircraft
Single-engined tractor aircraft
Aircraft first flown in 1929